Arena Khimki is a football stadium in Khimki, Russia. Located 300 metres north of the MKAD highway, it lies on the Moscow Oblast side of the border with Moscow. It is the home stadium of FC Khimki.

History
The stadium holds 18,636 spectators and was opened in 2008 to become the home stadium of FC Khimki. Since 2009 Dynamo Moscow have also been playing at the Arena Khimki as their home, Dynamo Stadium, has been undergoing reconstruction. When FC Khimki were relegated from the Russian Premier League, they left for Rodina Stadium and CSKA moved to the Arena Khimki from the Luzhniki.

Besides Russian Premier League matches, the Arena Khimki hosted Champions League Matches (Dynamo-Celtic), Europa League Matches, Russian Cup final in 2009 and matches of Russian national team U-21 in 2009.

CSKA moved to their own stadium in 2016, and Dynamo's was complete in 2019. FC Khimki returned to the Russian Premier League in 2018, and have used the stadium as their home ground since then.

See also
Other stadiums in Khimki:
 Rodina Stadium
 Novye Khimki Stadium

External links
 Official web 
 Stadium picture

Football venues in Russia
Arena Khimki
Sports venues completed in 2008
Arena Khimki
Arena Khimki
Arena Khimki